Jericho Vibar Rosales (born September 22, 1979, also known as Echo, is a Filipino actor and singer.

Primarily a film and television actor, he is known by his stage name "Echo".  He began his career by winning the Mr. Pogi ("Handsome") talent search on the noontime variety television show Eat Bulaga!  His career has spanned over 20 years and a variety of genres, warranting the moniker, "Asian Drama King of Primetime."

Career

Rosales gained international stardom in several countries (Malaysia, China, Ghana, Cambodia, Peru, Colombia, and many others) for his primetime soaps such as Pangako Sa 'Yo (2000–2002), Sana'y Wala Nang Wakas (2003–2004) and Dahil May Isang Ikaw (2009–2010), all co-starring Kristine Hermosa. Since its original release, Pangako Sa 'Yo has aired in over 20 foreign territories, with the Cambodian Television Network ordering a local remake in 2013. In Peru, Rosales is known for his role in the series Bridges of Love ("Puentes de Amor"), the first Filipino drama to air in the country and the Latin American market. Similarly, The Legal Wife (2014), which also stars Maja Salvador and Angel Locsin, have gained much popularity in the African and Balkan regions.

In 2006 he portrayed Filipino boxing champion Manny Pacquiao in Pacquiao: The Movie, and bagged two Best Actor trophies for his work. He repeated this in 2008, when he won two more Best Actor awards for his role in the classic film Baler, opposite Anne Curtis.

In 2012, Rosales played the lead role in Alagwa (Breakaway, internationally), for which he won Best Actor Trophy at the 36th Gawad Urian Awards.

The following years found him in a string of Metro Manila Film Festival entries. In 2016, Rosales played Philippine national hero Jose Rizal in Bonifacio: Ang Unang Pangulo, which starred Robin Padilla as the eponymous character. His succeeding films were comedies, with rom-com #WalangForever in 2015, starring opposite Jennylyn Mercado; Ang Babae Sa Septic Tank 2: #ForeverIsNotEnough in 2016 - sequel to Quantum Film's satirical 2011 hit starring Eugene Domingo; and then played opposite Bela Padilla in 2017's Luck At First Sight.

In late 2017, he played Diego in surf romance film Siargao, directed by Paul Soriano. Set in the eponymous Philippine island, he co-stars Erich Gonzales and Jasmine Curtis-Smith.

Personal life
Rosales was born in Quezon City, but was raised in Bula, Camarines Sur where he learned to speak Rinconada Bikol.

He married Kim Jones in a beach wedding ceremony in Boracay on May 1, 2014.

Filmography

Television

Film

Discography

Animal activism
During February 2014, Rosales became actively involved in a campaign to Free Mali, the lonely elephant who has been living in a small, concrete enclosure at the Manila Zoo for more than 35 years. The campaign is led by animal rights group PETA (People for the Ethical Treatment of Animals). Rosales showed his support by posing for a photograph holding up a sign that reads "JERICHO ROSALES WANTS MALI FREED"."

Producer

Awards and nominations

References

External links
 
 Jericho Rosales profile at Telebisyon.net

1979 births
Living people
Bicolano actors
Filipino male film actors
Filipino male television actors
21st-century Filipino male singers
Bicolano people
People from Marikina
Male actors from Metro Manila
Participants in Philippine reality television series
Filipino male models
Filipino evangelicals
Filipino male comedians
Filipino people of Spanish descent
ABS-CBN personalities
People from Camarines Sur
Viva Artists Agency
Star Music artists